Katharina Theresia Huber (born 1965) is a German applied mathematician and mathematical biologist whose research concerns phylogenetic trees, evolutionary analysis, their mathematical foundations, and their mathematical visualization. She is an associate professor in the School of Computing Sciences at the University of East Anglia in England, and the school's director of postgraduate research.

Education and career
Huber completed a doctorate in mathematics at Bielefeld University in 1997. Her dissertation, A T-theoretical Approach to Phylogenetic Analysis and Cluster Analysis, was jointly supervised by Andreas Dress and Walter Deuber.

After postdoctoral research at Massey University in New Zealand, Huber became a lecturer in mathematics at Mid Sweden University in Sundsvall, Sweden in 2000. She moved to the Department of Biometry and Engineering of the Uppsala University in Sweden in 2003, and to the School of Computing Sciences at the University of East Anglia in 2004, where she became a senior lecturer in 2012.

Contributions
Huber is a coauthor of the book Basic Phylogenetic Combinatorics (Cambridge University Press, 2012), and a codeveloper of the ape package for evolutionary analysis in the R statistical programming system.

Her other research publications include:

References

1965 births
Living people
German biologists
20th-century German mathematicians
German women biologists
German women mathematicians
Theoretical biologists
Applied mathematicians
Bielefeld University alumni
Academic staff of Mid Sweden University
Academic staff of Uppsala University
Academics of the University of East Anglia
21st-century German mathematicians